Millbrook 27 is a Mi'kmaq reserve located in Colchester County, Nova Scotia.

It is administratively part of the Millbrook First Nation.

Indian reserves in Nova Scotia
Communities in Colchester County
Mi'kmaq in Canada